Crowther is a locality in New South Wales, Australia.

A War Memorial was erected in Crowther to honour the death of local sharefarmer Private Nugent Robert Wildman in Bullecourt, France in May 1917 and includes an honour roll of local men who served in World War I.

See also
Crowther railway station

References

External links

Towns in New South Wales
Hilltops Council